Blackletter z (ℨ𝔷 𝖅𝖟) may refer to:
 tailed z
 Dram (unit)
 Unicode character names:
Fraktur in Unicode
Mathematical Alphanumeric Symbols

See also
z
Blackletter
Ezh (Ʒ ʒ)